John Stuart Gray (21 August 1941 – 21 October 2007) was a British-Norwegian marine biologist.

He was born in Bolsover, but migrated to Norway. After his PHD degree in 1965, he took the dr.scient. degree in 1976 and became a professor at the University of Oslo. He was a member of the Norwegian Academy of Science and Letters from 1980 and won the Fridtjof Nansen Prize for Outstanding Research in 1998.

References

1941 births
2007 deaths
British marine biologists
British emigrants to Norway
Academic staff of the University of Oslo
Members of the Norwegian Academy of Science and Letters